Jack R. Draxler is an American politician and a former  Republican member of the Utah House of Representatives. He represented District 3 from January 2007 through January 2017. Draxler was previously the mayor of North Logan.

Early life and career
Draxler earned his BS degree from Utah State University and currently works as a real estate appraiser. He lives in North Logan, Utah with his wife, Marilyn.

Political career
In 2014, Draxler was unopposed in the Republican primary and general election. He won the 2014 general election with 7,191 votes (100%).

In 2012, Draxler was unopposed for the June 26, 2012 Republican primary and won the November 6, 2012 general election with 9,995 votes (70.5%) against Democratic nominee Roger Donohoe.

In 2010, Draxler was unopposed for both the June 22, 2010 Republican primary and the November 2, 2010 general election, winning with 7,421 votes.

In 2008, Draxler was unopposed for the June 24, 2008 Republican primary and won the November 4, 2008 general election with 9,670 votes (74.1%) against Democratic nominee Tanya Taylor.

In 2006, when District 3 incumbent Republican Representative Craig Buttars retired and left the seat open, Draxler was unopposed for the 2006 Republican primary and won the November 7, 2006 general election with 4,611 votes (64.9%) against Democratic nominee Stuart Howell.

During the 2016 legislative session, Draxler served on the Higher Education Appropriations Subcommittee, the House Government Operations Committee, and the House Transportation Committee.

2016 sponsored legislation

Draxler passed four of the five bills he introduced during the 2016 legislative session, giving him an 80% passage rate. Draxler also floor sponsored ten bills.

References

External links
Official page at the Utah State Legislature
Jack Draxler at Ballotpedia
Jack R. Draxler at the National Institute on Money in State Politics

Place of birth missing (living people)
Year of birth missing (living people)
Living people
Mayors of places in Utah
Republican Party members of the Utah House of Representatives
People from Cache County, Utah
Utah State University alumni
21st-century American politicians